Bangaru Papa is a 1955 Indian Telugu-language film produced and directed by B. N. Reddy on Vauhini Productions banner. The film stars S. V. Ranga Rao, Jaggayya, Krishna Kumari, Jamuna. It is based on the 1861 English novel Silas Marner by George Eliot. 

Bangaru Papa won the President's Silver Medal for Best Feature Film in Telugu at the 3rd National Film Awards. B. N. Reddy considered the film as his best cinematic work. It showcased the acting skills of S. V. Ranga Rao. This film introduced the famous writer Palagummi Padmaraju to the film industry.

Plot

Kotayya (Ranga Rao) is a kind man. He marries Rami. She succumbs to pressure from Gopala Swamy and elopes with him, leaving her husband. Rami and Gopala successfully plan and send Kotayya to jail. After returning from jail, Kotayya becomes a rowdy drunkard. He plans to take revenge and kill Gopala Swamy.

During the fateful night when he prepares to implement his plan, he hears a little child's cries. His humanity overtakes his thirst for revenge. He takes the child, a girl named Papa, under his wings. Papa is the daughter of Manohar (Jaggayya) and Santha (Jamuna). The child's mother has died after giving birth to her. Manohar, the father, remarries.

Kotayya begins a new life in taking care of the child. He leaves rowdyism and drinking. The grown-up Papa is loved by Sekhar, the nephew of Manohar. Learning this, the landlord (Zamindar) calls Kotayya and shows anger with him. Then Manohar announces that Papa is his daughter. The landlord agrees to Sekhar's marriage with Papa and makes Kotayya happy.

Cast
 S. V. Ranga Rao as Kotayya
 Krishna Kumari as Papa
 Jaggayya as Manohar
 Hemalatha
 Jamuna as Santha
 Ramana Reddy
 Vangara Venkata Subbaiah
 Ramanna Pantulu
 Rama Sharma
 Vidyavathi

Soundtrack
Music was composed by Addepalli Rama Rao. Four of the songs including Harikatha were written by Devulapalli Krishnasastri.
 "Harikatha" of Seeta Apaharanam (Lyrics: Devulapalli Krishnasastri)
 "Kanna Devaki Vantu Kanneere Kaani" (Lyrics: Devulapalli Krishnasastri)
 "Kanulakokasaraina Kanapadani Naa Talli" (Lyrics: Devulapalli Krishnasastri; Singer: P. Susheela)
 "Tadhimi Takadhimi Tolubomma" (Lyrics: Devulapalli Krishnasastri; Singer: Madhavapeddi Satyam)
 "Vennela Pandirilona" (Singers: A. M. Rajah and P. Susheela)
 "Vennela Velalu" (Singer: P. Susheela)
 "Yavvana Madhuvanilo" (Lyrics: Devulapalli Krishnasastri; Singers: A. M. Rajah and P. Susheela)

Awards
 1955 - National Film Award for Best Feature Film in Telugu

References

External links

1955 films
1950s Telugu-language films
Indian black-and-white films
Films scored by Addepalli Rama Rao
Films based on British novels
Best Telugu Feature Film National Film Award winners
Indian drama films
1955 drama films